John Dhanraj (Tamil:ஜான் தன்ராஜ்) is an Indian television host. He hosted DD Podhigai from 2010 to 2013. As of 2014 he is the host of Kalaignar TV's Nenju Porukkuthillaiye, which discusses social problems. He is the recipient of Edison Awards (India) for the best Anchor for Kaara Saram.

Early life

Dhanraj was born in Chennai district Tamil Nadu, India. He pursued his law degree at Madras Law College, Chennai.

Career

Dhanraj began his career in 1992 on the Sun TV (India) program kavidhai Kelungal, an on spot poem show. He later hosted kaara saram program(2010-2013) for DD Podhigai,a social awareness program. He is currently hosting Nenju Porukkuthillaiye, broadcast on Kalaignar TV.

Lyricist

Dhanraj wrote several songs for the movie Manadhil our maargazhi (Tamil) and Lillies of March (Malayalam)

Television works

References

Indian television talk show hosts
Living people
Screenwriters from Chennai
Indian lyricists
Year of birth missing (living people)